Success at Any Price is a 1934 sound film starring Douglas Fairbanks Jr., Genevieve Tobin, Frank Morgan and silent film star Colleen Moore. It is based on the 1932 play Success Story by John Howard Lawson.

Plot
Joe, an amoral capitalist and boyfriend of Sarah Griswold, gets a job as a clerk in a New York City advertising agency and starts to work his way to the top. He is fired, but Sarah intervenes on his behalf and he manages to create an ad that earns him a promotion. He meets the mistress of his boss and decides to woo the mistress away. The company is in trouble, but Joe has invested wisely and sells out his boss to his competitor. He abandons Sarah and proposes to the mistress, who marries him. Joe becomes head of his agency, but because he neglects his new wife, she becomes the mistress of another man. He attempts suicide, but Sarah rescues him and nurses him back to health.

Cast
 Douglas Fairbanks, Jr. as Joe Martin
 Genevieve Tobin as Agnes [Carter]
 Frank Morgan as [Raymond] Merritt
 Colleen Moore as Sarah [Griswold]
 Edward Everett Horton as [Harry] Fisher
 Nydia Westman as Dinah
 Henry Kolker as Hatfield
 Allen Vincent as Geoffrey Halliburton

References

Bibliography
 Jeff Codori (2012), Colleen Moore; A Biography of the Silent Film Star, McFarland Publishing,(Print , EBook ).

External links
 
 
 
 

1934 films
1934 drama films
American business films
American drama films
American black-and-white films
Films about businesspeople
American films based on plays
Films directed by J. Walter Ruben
Films set in New York City
RKO Pictures films
1930s English-language films
1930s American films